The Scout and Guide movement in Pakistan is served by
 Pakistan Girl Guides Association, member of the World Association of Girl Guides and Girl Scouts
 Pakistan Boy Scouts Association, member of the World Organization of the Scout Movement

From September 2007, Scouting was to become compulsory in schools. The aim is to have one million youth volunteers to help out in emergencies. Two per cent of exam fees collected by the examination boards will be paid to the various Scouting and Guiding organisations.

See also

References